The 1992 Tennents' Sixes was the ninth staging of the indoor 6-a-side football tournament. It was held at the Scottish Exhibition and Conference Centre (SECC) in Glasgow on 19 and 20 January.

Clubs from the 1991-92 Premier Division season competed except Rangers and Aberdeen and the two group winners and runners-up qualified to the semi-finals and Celtic won their only Sixes title beating St Johnstone 4–2.

Group 1

Group 2

Semi-finals

Final

References

External links
Scottish Football Historical Archive

1991–92 in Scottish football
Tennents' Sixes
January 1992 sports events in the United Kingdom
1990s in Glasgow
Football in Glasgow
Sports competitions in Glasgow